This is a list of airports in Greenland, grouped by type and sorted by location. Air travel is extremely important in Greenland, since there are generally no roads between settlements. Arctic Umiaq Line provides passenger and freight services by sea but is limited to the southwest coast and travel time is long and departures sparse.

History 

The first airports in Greenland were built by and for the United States defense. The first and largest was Kangerlussuaq Airport in 1941, followed by Narsarsuaq Airport in 1942 (and now-abandoned USAAF airfields Bluie East Two and Marrak Point, both in 1942) and Thule Air Base in 1953 (although Thule is not operated as a civilian airport) and Kulusuk Airport in 1956. Due to their distance from major settlements, these were not initially used for civilian travel. In the early 1960s, Greenlandair was founded, commencing civilian flights between the air bases, and helicopter and sea plane flights to large settlements. SAS operated the connection from Copenhagen to Kangerlussuaq, beginning in 1954 as a fuel stop en route to United States, which was later taken over in 2000 by Air Greenland.

Beginning with Nuuk Airport in 1979 and Ilulissat Airport in 1983, several airports with short runways were built.

Airports 

Many locations in Greenland have Danish names in addition to their Greenlandic names. The Danish name, where applicable, is shown in italics. Airport or heliport names shown in bold indicate the facility has scheduled passenger service on a commercial airline.

Several of the airports do not have road connection with the local major settlement, so a helicopter transfer is often needed by most passengers to some airports. Airports with a very small population reachable by road include Kangerlussuaq Airport, Kulusuk Airport, Narsarsuaq Airport, Nerlerit Inaat Airport and Qaarsut Airport. 13 civil airports (not Thule Air Base) and 47 helipads in Greenland are operated by the state-owned enterprise Greenland Airport Authority (Mittarfeqarfiit).

Aerodromes
The following 14 airports are listed under AD 2 AERODROMES at Naviair.

The following aerodromes also exist. They have no scheduled flights.

Not included and not open for flights anymore are the former United States Army Air Forces bases of Bluie East Two and Marrak Point.

Heliports

The following 47 heliports are listed under AD 4 HELIPORTS at Naviair.

The following four heliports are not listed by Naviair.

Statistics
Mittarfeqarfiit only publishes statistics summarized for Atlantic airports (Kangerlussuaq and Narsarsuaq) and for other airports (11 airports). 13 airports are included, not Thule air base.

Future
At a late 2011 Air Greenland meeting, plans to move the main Greenland intercontinental air hub away from Kangerlussuaq were agreed upon. From 2011 it has not been possible to buy new aircraft, except for very small ones, which can use the  airstrips which are common in Greenland including Nuuk Airport. So something needs to be done before the fleet of Bombardier Dash 8 Q200 is retired in future (before 2030).

Also to replace Narsarsuaq with a new airport at Qaqortoq. Construction start of Nuuk was late 2019.

Alongside Kangerlussuaq, if airports at Qaqortoq, Tasiilaq and Ittoqqortoormiit are built, the airports at Narsarsuaq, Kulusuk and Nerlerit Inaat will also be closed. The remaining airports in Greenland will keep their short size and smaller aircraft be used for them.

See also
 List of airlines of Greenland
 Air Greenland destinations
 Transport in Greenland
 Civil Aviation Administration Denmark (Statens Luftfartsvæsen) (former Civil Aviation Administration for Denmark, Greenland, Faroe Islands)
 List of airports by ICAO code: B#BG - Greenland
 Wikipedia: Airline destination lists: North America#Greenland (Denmark)

References
 
  – includes IATA codes

 
Airports in Greenland
Airports
Greenland
Greenland
+Greenland